The Handflammpatrone DM34 Cartridge Launcher model HAFLA-35L ("hand-held flame-cartridge") was a single-shot, disposable incendiary weapon issued to the German Armed Forces from 1976 to 2001. Manufactured by Buck KG. An earlier version HAFLA-35 had been in service from 1965. The weapon consisted of three compressed sections of incendiary red phosphorus contained in a projectile with a time fuse and bursting/scattering charge. The cartridge was held in an aluminium launch tube, externally reinforced with pasteboard. A pivoting handgrip with safety button, a primer and initial propelling charge are at one end of this tube, the other end with the cartridge being sealed with a plastic cover, making a watertight unit. The firing mechanism is locked until the safety button is pressed and the handle unfolded, an act that exposes the trigger and releases a safety mechanism. When the trigger is pulled, the primer ignites the initial propelling charge, setting the red phosphorus round in motion. Immediately a second propelling charge at the back of the cartridge accelerates the round out of the tube and also initiates a delay fuse. The round would either shatter on hard contact by kinetic energy alone after travelling at least 8 metres, spreading the incendiary content over a 5 to 8 metre area (in this case the scattering charge does not explode), or if fired into the air over enemy dispositions, the cartridge would be burst by a scattering charge after 1.3 seconds of flight (this represents forward travel of 70-80 m), the scattering charge being ignited by the delay fuse. The heat of the bursting charge and friction through the air changes the red phosphorus to white phosphorus which then self-ignites as it spreads. When burst in flight, the incendiary material spreads across an area approximately 10 m wide and 15 m long and burns at 1,300 °C.  The incendiary charge will burn for two minutes.

Also produced by PRB in Belgium as the CALID NR 179 red phosphorus.

There was a practice version of the HAFLA . It had the same dimensions and weight as the HAFLA-35L but had an inert filling of lime and a smoke marker to indicate the point of impact.

Weight: 625 g
Calibre: 35 mm
Range: 8–90 meters
Length: 445 mm
Incendiary composition red phosphorus
Weight of composition: 240 g
packing: 3 HAFLAs per pouch: 51 HAFLAs per crate.

See also

List of flamethrowers

Cold War weapons of Germany
Flamethrowers
Incendiary weapons
Military equipment introduced in the 1970s